Dumbarton Central railway station serves the town of Dumbarton in West Dunbartonshire, Scotland.

History 
The company was subsequently absorbed by the Edinburgh and Glasgow Railway in 1862 and eventually became part of the North British Railway three years later. However, in 1891, the North British was forced to come to an agreement with the rival Caledonian Railway to give the latter access to Balloch (and the Loch Lomond steamships) over C&DJR metals in order to prevent the building of a competing route by the Caledonian company - this resulted in the Lanarkshire and Dumbartonshire Railway arriving from  via  in 1896. Trains on the West Highland Railway also began serving the station following its completion on 1 August 1894 and these continue to call here to this day.

The station was built with two island platforms to permit convenient interchange between the various services that called, although only three faces remain in use (the former down loop on the southbound side having been removed). The Helensburgh and Balloch lines were electrified by British Railways as part of the 1960 North Clyde Line electrification scheme, but most of the L&DR route was closed (other than the short section through neighbouring ) when passenger services to Possil via  were withdrawn on 5 October 1964 as a result of the Beeching Axe. As of 2022, the loop platform on the south side of the station receives no regular services.

Building 
It is a category A listed building under the Town and Country Planning (Listed Buildings and Conservation Areas) (Scotland) Act 1997.

Services

North Clyde Line / Argyle Line 

West Highland Line 

The Highland Sleeper service also calls in each direction daily (except Saturday nights southbound and Sunday mornings northbound), giving the station a direct link to/from London Euston via Edinburgh,  and the West Coast Main Line.

References

Notes

Sources 
 
 

Railway stations in West Dunbartonshire
Former Dumbarton and Balloch Railway stations
Railway stations in Great Britain opened in 1850
Railway stations served by ScotRail
Railway stations served by Caledonian Sleeper
SPT railway stations
Railway station
Category A listed buildings in West Dunbartonshire
Listed railway stations in Scotland